Nicolletia occidentalis is a flowering plant in the tribe Tageteae of the family Asteraceae which is known by the common name Mojave hole-in-the-sand plant.

This flower is native to California, especially the Mojave Desert, and northern Baja California.

Description
Nicolletia occidentalis is a desert-adapted perennial herb with a skeletonlike appearance. The narrow, fleshy leaves each end in a bristle and have large oil glands which exude a strong unpleasant scent. The plant grows from a deep taproot in the desert sand and the stem is sometimes surrounded by a depression in the sand, a trait that gives it its common name.

This plant bears showy flowers with curving bright pink ray florets and yellow centers.

External links
Jepson Manual Treatment
USDA Plants Profile
Photo gallery

Tageteae
Flora of California
Flora of Baja California
Flora of the California desert regions
Flora of the Sierra Nevada (United States)
Natural history of the Mojave Desert
Taxa named by Asa Gray
Plants described in 1845
Flora without expected TNC conservation status